Dambuk Legislative Assembly constituency is one of the 60 Legislative Assembly constituencies of Arunachal Pradesh state in India.

It is part of Lower Dibang Valley district and is reserved for candidates belonging to the Scheduled Tribes.

Members of the Legislative Assembly

Election results

2019

See also
 List of constituencies of the Arunachal Pradesh Legislative Assembly
 Lower Dibang Valley district

References

Lower Dibang Valley district
Assembly constituencies of Arunachal Pradesh